{ "type": "ExternalData", "service": "page", "title": "Western Australian region - Kimberley.map" }

The Kimberley is the northernmost of the nine regions of Western Australia. It is bordered on the west by the Indian Ocean, on the north by the Timor Sea, on the south by the Great Sandy and Tanami deserts in the region of the Pilbara, and on the east by the Northern Territory.

The region was named in 1879 by government surveyor Alexander Forrest after Secretary of State for the Colonies John Wodehouse, 1st Earl of Kimberley.

History
The Kimberley was one of the earliest settled parts of Australia, with the first humans landing about 65,000 years ago. They created a complex culture that developed over thousands of years. Yam (Dioscorea hastifolia) agriculture was developed, and rock art suggests that this was where some of the earliest boomerangs were invented. The worship of Wandjina deities was most common in this region, and a complex theology dealing with the transmigration of souls was part of the local people's religious philosophy.

During the 18th century, Dutch explorers named the region of Kimberley and nearby Darwin variations of Van Diemen's Land after the VOC governor-general Anthony van Diemen. This should not be confused with the more general and prolonged use of the same name for Tasmania.

In 1837, with expedition support from the Royal Geographical Society of Great Britain, Lieutenants George Grey and Franklin Lushington and 12 men sailed on the schooner Lynher from Cape Town, South Africa. They reached Hanover Bay on 2 December 1837. The exploring party started inland on 19 January 1838. Leaders and men were totally inexperienced, their progress was delayed by flooded country, and they abandoned many stores along the way. The party was constantly split up although they had to contend with large numbers of hostile Aboriginals. On 11 February, Grey was speared and became critically ill but, after two weeks, continued the exploration. The party found and named the Gairdner River, the Glenelg River, the Stephen and Whately ranges and Mount Lyell before returning to Hanover Bay in April.

In 1879, Western Australian government surveyor Alexander Forrest led a party of seven from the west coast at Beagle Bay to Katherine, Northern Territory. Forrest explored and named the Kimberley district, the Margaret and Ord rivers and the King Leopold Ranges (now the Wunaamin-Miliwundi Ranges), and located well watered pastoral lands along the Fitzroy and Ord rivers.

In 1881, Philip Saunders and Adam Johns, in the face of great difficulties and dangers, found gold in various parts of the Kimberley. Early in 1881, the first five graziers, who called themselves the Murray Squatting Company, took up  behind Beagle Bay and named it Yeeda Station. In 1883 they were the first men to shear sheep in the southern Kimberley. Additional Anglo-European settlement occurred in 1885, when ranchers drove cattle across Australia from the eastern states in search of good pasture lands. After gold was discovered around Halls Creek, many other erstwhile European miners arrived rapidly.

In the 1890s, the area was the site of an armed insurrection of indigenous people led by Jandamarra, a Bunuba warrior.

During World War II, when Australia was among the nations at war with the Axis powers, the Japanese invaded the nation with only a small reconnaissance party in the Kimberley on 19 January 1944; they were investigating reports that the Allies were building large bases in the region. Four Japanese officers were on board a small fishing boat. They investigated the York Sound region for a day and a night before returning to Kupang in Timor on 20 January. After returning to Japan in February, the junior officer, who had commanded the party, suggested using 200 Japanese prison inmates to launch a guerrilla campaign in Australia.  No superior adopted his suggestion, and the officer was posted to other duties.

Demographics
The 2011 estimated permanent population of the Kimberley was 34,794 but it rises dramatically during winter when it attracts a seasonal population. On Census night in 2011 (9 August), it was 50,113. The population is fairly evenly distributed, with only three towns having populations in excess of 2,000: Broome (12,766), Derby (3,261), and Kununurra (4,573). Approximately 40% of the region's population is of Aboriginal descent.

Urban centres and localities

Indigenous languages
The Kimberley has been noted as a region of great linguistic diversity, rivalled in Australia only by the Top End. Depending on the geographical boundaries of the Kimberley, and the definition of what constitutes a "language" (as opposed to a "dialect"), about 50-60 Aboriginal languages were once spoken in this region. The vast majority of these do not belong to the family of Pama-Nyungan languages. Four endemic, primary language families are recognized within the core Kimberley region:

 Nyulnyulan languages, including languages spoken on the Dampier Peninsula and along the Fitzroy River
 Bunuban languages, including languages spoken in the Fitzroy River Basin
 Worrorran languages, including languages spoken in the northern Kimberley, north of King Sound, up to Wyndham
 Jarrakan languages, including languages spoken along the Ord River, from Halls Creek up to Wyndham and Kununurra.

Pama-Nyungan languages spoken in and around the Kimberley region include the Marrngu languages (such as Karajarri and Nyangumarta, the Ngumpin languages (such as Walmajarri and Jaru), the Yapa languages (such as Warlpiri) and the Western Desert languages (including Wangkajunga and Kukatja). Non-Pama-Nyungan languages spoken around the Kimberleys (but speakers of which today live within the Kimberley) include the Daly language Murrinh-Patha and Western Mirndi language Jaminjung.

Presently, many indigenous languages are no longer spoken on a daily basis. In addition to Australian English, post-contact languages spoken in the Kimberley include Aboriginal English, Kriol, Pidgin English and the Malay-based Broome Pearling Lugger Pidgin (not spoken on a daily basis any more).

Politics
At the federal level, the Kimberley is represented by the member for Durack. At state level, the Kimberley electorate takes in all of the region and its towns.

The Kimberley region consists of the local government areas of Broome, Derby-West Kimberley, Halls Creek and Wyndham-East Kimberley.

Art 
Rock art in the Kimberley is some of the oldest in Australia and could date back 40,000 years. The best known examples of rock art from the Kimberley are Wandjina and Gwion Gwion.  The earliest form of Kimberley rock art was hand stencils, and rock art continued up to the 1960s when Wandjina were still being repainted.

Some of Australia's best known indigenous artists came from the Kimberley. These artists painted in a style unique to this area, a style initially associated with the Krill Krill ceremony but later known as the Kimberley Art Movement. These artists include Rover Thomas, Jaminji Paddy Bedford and Queenie McKenzie.

Art and culture still flourishes today, with many contemporary artists being supported by the Mowanjum Aboriginal Arts and Cultural centre.

Geography

The Kimberley consists of the ancient, steep-sided mountain ranges of northwestern Australia cut through with sandstone and limestone gorges and steep ridges, from which the extreme monsoonal climate has removed much of the soil. The southern end of the Kimberley beyond the Dampier Peninsula is flatter with dry tropical grassland and is used for cattle ranching. In parts of the Kimberley, such as the valleys of the Ord and Fitzroy Rivers in the south, the soils are relatively usable cracking clays, whilst elsewhere they are lateritic Orthents. Although none of the mountains reach even , there is so much steep land as to make much of the region difficult to traverse, especially during the wet season, when even sealed roads are often flooded. The coast is typically steep cliffs in the north but flatter in the south, all subject to high tides.

Climate
The Kimberley has a tropical monsoon climate. The region receives about 90% of its rainfall during the short wet season, from November to April, when cyclones are common (especially around Broome) and the rivers flood. In the dry season, from May to October, south easterly breezes bring sunny days and cool nights. A recent study suggests Asian pollution may be a key contributory factor to this increased rainfall. In 1997 and 2000, the region received especially heavy rains, leading to record flooding of the Fitzroy and other rivers.

The Aboriginal people of the Kimberley recognise six traditional seasons based on meteorological events, as well as on observations of flora and fauna.

Geology

During the Devonian period, a barrier reef system formed before a subsequent drop in sea levels over the Kimberley. This reef system was similar to the Great Barrier Reef and is still visible today in the form of the Napier Range and the Ningbing Range. Some of the features are Tunnel Creek, Windjana Gorge and Geikie Gorge.

This area is also known as the Kimberley Block physiographic province, of which it is part of the larger West Australian Shield division. This province contains the Wunaamin-Miliwundi Range, Durack Range, Leveque Rise, Browse Depression, and Londonderry Rise physiographic sections.

Coastline

In Bureau of Meteorology weather reports the "North Kimberley Coast" is the WA border to Kuri Bay section of the coast, while the "West Kimberley Coast" is from Kuri Bay to Wallal Downs.  Significant sections of the coastline between Broome and Wyndham have no means of road access, and boat or helicopter are the only means.  Due to the isolation, a number of tourist operations on the coastline have been called "wilderness" locations.

Ecology
The rugged and varied sandstone landscape is home to a distinctive mixture of wildlife, which has been thoroughly mapped and described by the Western Australian Department of Conservation and Land Management. There are habitats similar to the Kimberley across the border in the Northern Territory, including the valleys of the Victoria and Daly Rivers but these have been less carefully studied.

Flora

Much of the Kimberley is chiefly covered in open savanna woodland dominated by low bloodwood and boab trees (Adansonia gregorii) with Darwin stringybark and Darwin woollybutt eucalyptus in the wetter areas. The red sandy soil of the Dampier Peninsula in the south is known for its characteristic pindan wooded grassland, while in the more fertile areas like the Ord Valley, the trees are found in grasslands of Chrysopogon, Aristida, Dichanthium and Xerochloa (rice grass) in the wetter valleys. The banks of the Ord, Fitzroy River and other rivers are home to a greater variety of vegetation, while in sheltered gorges of the high rainfall north there are patches of tropical dry broadleaf forest, called monsoon forests, deciduous vine forest or vine thicket in Australia (often mistakenly called "dry rainforest"), which were unknown to science until 1965, and are one of the most floristically rich parts of Australia outside the Wet Tropics and southwestern WA. There are also areas of mangrove in river estuaries where the coast is flatter.

Flora regions
In 1979, Beard identified four phytogeographic districts within the Northern Botanical Province:
 Gardner District (Ga) in the north (and further divided into the West Gardner (WGa), Central Gardner (CGa) and East Gardner (EGa))
 Fitzgerald District (Fi) in the centre
 Dampier (Da) and Hall (Ha) Districts in the south

Fauna

Animals found here include the huge saltwater crocodile and a rich variety of birds such as the channel-billed cuckoo, Pacific koel, purple-crowned fairywren and the bowerbird. The sandstone gorges of north Kimberley are an important refuge for a particularly rich collection of endemic species including some that have disappeared from the flatter areas, including the purple-crowned fairywren, the endangered Gouldian finch and a large number of amphibians: flat-headed frog, cave-dwelling frog, magnificent tree frog, Derby toadlet, small toadlet, fat toadlet, the unconfirmed marbled toadlet, Mjoberg's toadlet, mole toadlet and stonemason's toadlet. Mammals that have declined especially in the flatlands include the bilby, northern quoll, pale field rat, golden-backed tree-rat, and golden bandicoot. Megabats such as the black flying foxes and little red flying foxes are common and perform important pollination and seed dispersal work for many species of native trees and shrubs.

A species of endemic gecko, Gehyra kimberleyi, is named after the Kimberley region.

The gorges of central Kimberley are known for their fossils and for their large colonies of bats, including Windjana, Tunnel Creek, and Geikie Gorges. Lake Argyle and other wetlands of the Ord and the Kimberley are important habitats while there are important populations of shorebirds in the Ord estuary, Eighty-mile Beach and Roebuck Bay, which has been described as "one of the most important stop-over areas for shorebirds in Australia and globally". Finally there are a number of rocky islands off the north coast that are home to seabirds and turtles.

Threats and preservation

Little of the Kimberley has been subject to wholesale clearance other than particularly fertile parts of the Ord Valley (and areas of Kimberley-type habitat across in the Daly River basin in the Northern Territory) but the pastureland in the southern areas has been affected by 100 years of livestock grazing and other threats including introduced weeds (such as cocklebur, parkinsonia, bellyache bush and castor oil plant), feral cats and changes to traditional Aboriginal fire regimes (the way grassland is burnt and allowed to renew). However, the remote sandstone areas to the north have valuable original habitats in good condition providing shelter for much wildlife.

The largest protected areas are the Prince Regent National Park and the Drysdale River National Park along with Gregory National Park and Keep River National Park across in the Northern Territory, which preserves similar habitats. (Keep River's nearest town is Kununurra in the Kimberley.)

The Kimberley is a popular tourist destination, with areas such as the Bungle Bungle Range, the Gibb River Road, Lake Argyle, El Questro Station, Mornington Sanctuary, Horizontal Falls and Cape Leveque. The Gibb River Road and the road into the Bungle Bungles can at times be accessed in a two-wheel drive car, although one can access many additional areas in a four-wheel drive vehicle.

Other parks in the region include Geikie Gorge National Park, Mirima National Park, Mitchell River National Park, Point Coulomb National Park, Purnululu National Park, Tunnel Creek National Park, Windjana Gorge National Park and Wolfe Creek Meteorite Crater National Park. In 2012 the Western Australian government announced the creation of the 7,062 square kilometre Camden Sound Marine Park with a further three to come.

Visitors to the area should be aware that the area can be subject to controlled burns at any time of year. In September 2011, a fire burned five people, two severely, who had been competing in the Kimberley Ultramarathon, an endurance cross country footrace.

Save the Kimberley campaign

The Wilderness Society has led a campaign to protest a proposal to industrialize the James Price Point area of Broome. The Woodside corporation, with the additional involvement of BHP Billiton and the Australian government, has sought to build a gas industrial complex, and those in opposition believe that such a development threatens the region. The campaign has received support from public figures such as John Butler, Clare Bowditch, Missy Higgins and former leader of the Australian Greens, Bob Brown.

On 5 October 2012, a concert was held at Federation Square in Melbourne, Australia, to raise awareness of the campaign; the protest event attracted approximately 6,000 people.

On 24 February 2013, an estimated 20,000 people gathered for a charity concert in Fremantle, Western Australia to raise awareness and funds to help protect the Kimberley, with performances from Ball Park Music, Missy Higgins, and John Butler.

Economy

The Kimberley region has a diverse regional economy. Mining, construction, tourism, retail, agriculture, and pearling are major contributors to the region's economic output.

The town of Broome has a flourishing pearling industry, which operates around the Kimberley coast. Some of the major farmers are Paspaley Pearls, Clipper Pearls, Broome Pearls and the Willie Creek Pearl Farm.

One third of the world's annual production of diamonds is mined at the Argyle and the Ellendale diamond mines. Oil is extracted from the Blina oil field and natural gas is expected to be taken from offshore sources soon. Zinc and lead were mined at the Pillara and Cadjebut mines near Fitzroy Crossing, with nickel still being mined at Sallay Mallay near Halls Creek. Derby is the nearest export base for shipping these metals.

Traditionally, the economy depended on pastoral leases, with most of the region covered by the leases.

More recently agriculture has been focused on the Ord River Irrigation Area near Kununurra. Irrigation was also trialled in the West Kimberley by way of the now defunct Camballin Irrigation Scheme. There are also fruit growers in Broome and in other areas in the West Kimberley. Beef cattle are grown in the Kimberley and exported live. Wyndham features the last remaining meatworks in the Kimberley - there were formerly works at Broome and Derby but financial constraints have caused these to be closed.

Barramundi are bred in Lake Argyle, and Broome features a fully equipped Aquaculture Park near the port; tenants include Paspaley Pearls and Broome TAFE. The Kimberley also has a thriving fishing industry.

Some of Australia's most prominent indigenous artists and art centres are in or adjacent to the Kimberley region. Artists such as Paddy Bedford and Freddie Timms have an international profile, and there are a number of Aboriginal-owned and controlled art centres and companies that assist artists, arrange exhibitions and sell works. The art centres in the region are also organized through the Association of Northern, Kimberley and Arnhem Aboriginal Artists. Issues have been raised regarding the exploitation of indigenous artists by businesses and individuals, including in the Kimberley, which were canvassed in an Australian Senate parliamentary committee report.

Tourism is expected to remain one of the Kimberley region's major growth industries. Averaged across 2010, 2011, and 2012, there were 292,600 domestic and international visitors to the Kimberley annually.

See also

 List of pastoral leases in Western Australia
 Kimberley-Perth Canal
 Kimberley Plan

References

General

External links

Kimberley Development Commission
Kununurra Historical Society Inc. Archive, Library, Museum & Research for links to history images of the Kimberley

 
Regions of Western Australia
Physiographic provinces
Drainage basins of Australia